Fosters or Foster's may refer to:

Places
 Fosters, Alabama
 Fosters, Michigan
 Fosters, Ohio

Television
 The Fosters (British TV series), a short-lived British sitcom that ran from 1976 to 1977
 The Fosters (American TV series), an American drama series that aired on Freeform from 2013 to 2018
 Foster's Home for Imaginary Friends, an animated television show on Cartoon Network

Other
 Foster's Cafeterias, a chain of cafeterias in San Francisco, California from the 1940s to 1972
 Foster's English Muffins, sourdough English muffins sold at Foster's cafeterias to take home
 Foster's Group, an Australian brewer and distributor
 Foster's Lager, an Australian beer
 Fosters Freeze, a chain of fast-food restaurants in California
 Fosters of Lincoln,  British agricultural machinery company, William Foster & Co.
 Fosters' Bank, in Cambridge, England

 Foster and Partners, also known as Fosters, a British firm of architects

See also
Foster (disambiguation)
Forster (disambiguation)
 The Fosters (disambiguation)